Triangle Lake is an unincorporated community in Lane County, Oregon, United States. Lake Creek, a tributary of the Siuslaw River, enters and exits the lake. Triangle Lake is closely linked to the unincorporated community of Blachly, on the northeast side of the lake, and the two communities share the K-12 Triangle Lake School, the only school in Blachly School District. Triangle Lake is served by the Blachly post office and the Pioneer Telephone Cooperative.

Lake

The  lake has had various names over the years, including Loon Lake, Lake of the Woods, and Echo Lake, but the name Triangle Lake (after the lake's shape) became the official name in the early 1900s. Before Fern Ridge Reservoir was completed in 1941, the lake was the most popular local spot for water sports.

Amenities at Triangle Lake County Park include two picnic tables, a boat dock, and toilets. Activities at the lake include boating, swimming, and fishing.

The kokanee, landlocked sockeye salmon, thrive in the deep water.

See also
List of lakes in Oregon

References

External links
Historic images of round barn near Triangle Lake from Salem Public Library

Unincorporated communities in Lane County, Oregon
Unincorporated communities in Oregon